Life Flight Network is a non profit air and ground critical care transport service based in Aurora, Oregon, in the northern Willamette Valley, with services in Oregon, Washington, Idaho, and Montana in the United States.

Operations

Service area 
It has 23 locations throughout the Columbia, Willamette and Snake river watersheds.

Bases 
Life Flight Network operates bases across the Pacific Northwest in Washington, Oregon, Idaho, and Montana. 
In Oregon there are bases in Aurora, Cottage Grove, Newport, Astoria, Pendleton, Redmond, Ontario, La Grande, and Salem. 
In Washington there are bases in Kelso, Brewster, Moses Lake, Richland, Pullman, Spokane, Dallesport, Port Angeles, Coupeville, and Walla Walla. 
In Idaho there are bases at Boise, Burley, Sandpoint, Lewiston, and Coeur d'Alene.
In Montana there are bases in Missoula, Butte, and Bozeman. 
It also has fixed-wing bases in Aurora, Boise, Dallesport, Moses Lake, La Grande, Richland, Butte, Lewiston, and Port Angeles.

LifeFlight gained part 135 certification in 2013 from the Boise Idaho FSDO.

In 2013 LifeFlight chose the Agusta 119KX as its helicopter platform leasing them for 10 years from a Chinese firm. Arizona-based Tri-State care flight assisted LFN in bridging the gap by allowing LFN to operate their new aircraft under Tri State’s 135 certificate while maintaining in-service status and attaining their own part 135 certificate.

Currently as of 2021 LFN is dissolving its A119Kx fleet and replacing them with Bell 429s and 407s as the 10-year lease is coming due.

Fleet and equipment  

As of 2021 Life Flight Network has a combined fleet of medical helicopters, fixed-wing aircraft, and ground ambulances.

Specific fleet vehicles include:

 AgustaWestland AW119 Koala "Koala" 
 AgustaWestland AW109 "Power"
 Eurocopter EC135
 Bell 429
 Bell 407
 Cessna Citation CJ4
 Pilatus PC-12

Crew 
Each medical flight typically includes a Flight Nurse, Flight Paramedic, and Pilot. Neonatal nurses and respiratory therapists may also accompany patients requiring specialty care during transport.

Ownership and funding 
The consortium of Oregon Health & Science University, Legacy Emanuel Medical Center, Saint Alphonsus Regional Medical Center, and Providence Health & Services own Life Flight Network

Life Flight is supported by annual membership fees and other sources of revenue.

References

External links
 

Air ambulance services in the United States
Airlines based in Oregon
Companies based in Marion County, Oregon
Medical and health organizations based in Oregon
Non-profit organizations based in Oregon
Aurora, Oregon